Loeki de Leeuw (Loeki the Lion, also incorrectly spelled as Loekie de Leeuw) is a Dutch stop-motion TV animation, broadcast on Dutch public television between 1972 and 2004, with revivals in 2019 and again since 2021. It features a puppet lion in short sketches usually not longer than five seconds, which appeared as bumpers between commercial breaks. These animated shorts reached iconic status in the Netherlands, but were also broadcast in some other countries like France, the United Kingdom, Austria, Italy, Japan and the United States.

Concept

Loeki is a lion who usually encounters an absurd situation or does something clumsy in his films. Each short lasted only five seconds and was done almost entirely without dialogue, except for Loeki's catchphrase: "Asjemenou?" ("Well, I ever?" or more informally "What the heck?") which usually appeared as his closing statement to each film. When things turned out in his favor, he typically said: "Voilà!" ("There you go!"). Loeki was named after the famous Dutch football player Louis Biesbrouck (Loek). The series also has a group of side characters, but Loeki is the most well known.

History
Loeki de Leeuw was originally created by animator  (1913–1984) in 1952 as a mascot for KLM in honor of the Netherlands national football team. In the early-1970s, new regulatory requirements for television advertising, originally introduced on Dutch public television in 1967, were drawn up so that the public could make a clear distinction between the series and the commercials, and the solution chosen was a short break bumper which would signal the beginning and end of the advertisement breaks, as well as bumpers that played between advertisements, which marked Loeki's move to television. These bumpers consisted of humorous animations of Loeki and his gang, and were such a success with the public that Loeki soon started appearing in between individual ads. Studio Geesink, who made the animated shorts, estimate that over 7,000 individual films were made, several of which survive on home-made VHS recordings which have been uploaded to YouTube. 

Since Loeki de Leeuw was purely visual comedy, it had no trouble being sold to other countries too. Some of his shorts have been broadcast in France, Austria, Italy, Japan and the United States. In its later years, Westward Television of the United Kingdom would occasionally use a short clip of Loeki at closedown. Some of these have been uploaded to YouTube. Also the regional German TV channel Nord-3 & N3 aired Loeki de Leeuw clips between 22 February 1972 and 2 December 2001 and later on Südwest 3. Until 1998. Loeki de Leeuw was also aired by TF1 in France and in the USA WFLD.

STER retired Loeki in late 2004, citing increasingly unaffordable production costs; the time saved by axing Loeki's appearances would instead be sold to advertisers.

Original puppets and props from Loeki's films have been exhibited since December 2006 in a large display at the Netherlands Institute for Sound and Vision in Hilversum. They consist of a number of series on themes (holidays, sports, transport, etc.). Puppets, props and films also formed part of the exhibition "100 years of advertising classics" in the Beurs van Berlage between 18 December 2010 and 6 March 2011.

Loeki made a one-off return to Dutch television on 30 January 2019, after a petition started by a radio show a week earlier reached more than ten thousand signatures within 24 hours. A Loeki short produced in late 2016, featuring the lion as a DJ, was shown shortly before 8pm that night on NPO 1; the film reached an audience of 1.4 million people. STER stated that they were seriously considering proposals to bring the character back on a permanent basis, although the following month STER decided against reintroducing Loeki during its advertising blocks, again citing high production costs.

On 1 March 2021, it was announced that Loeki will make a comeback in the summer during TV coverage of major sports-events; a fulltime return could be on the cards if successful. Loeki returned on 9 May 2021, ready for the upcoming Eurovision Song Contest in Rotterdam.

In June 2021, Ster announced that Loeki would remain on screen after the conclusion of that summer's major events, with new spots being made for longer-term use. The new films are made in part using computers. Loeki himself continues to be animated in stop-motion, a condition rights-holder Louise Geesink set as part of Loeki's return to television.

Legacy
Loeki is the mascot of the theme park Huis ten Bosch, in Nagasaki. His name also inspired three Dutch-language TV awards, namely "De Gouden Loeki" ("Golden Loeki") for "best TV commercial", its Flemish counterpart "De Gouden Welp" ("The Golden Lion Cub") and "De Loden Leeuw" ("The Lead Lion") for "worst TV commercial."

On 16 March 2005, Loeki was supposedly kidnapped by a student from Utrecht, because they did not want him to wither away in a dusty archive. It turned out to be a publicity stunt, when Loeki moved to the Efteling amusement park. After 2005, Loeki was used there to supplement the Carnival Festival. This attraction was also designed in 1984 by Joop Geesink. Loeki was removed from Carnival Festival in 2012 and replaced by their original mascot, Jokie.

On 21 August 2005, Loeki returned to television in a commercial for Edah. This was Loeki's first appearance on commercial channels. This appearance used 3D animation rather than the traditional stop-motion format.

The European Football Championship 2008 used Loeki in an advertisement for supermarket chain C1000.

In June 2010, Loeki returned to Dutch TV for the World Cup 2010 promotional activities of Samsung. Loeki was featured in a TV commercial, online at Facebook, as a car sticker and in a life-size form as part of the Orange "building wrap" on the Samsung headquarters in Delft. The various shapes of the famous multimedia advertising lion are provided by communication Quince.

In 2016, an early Loeki de Leeuw short was featured in a commercial for ING Group.

Media adaptations
A pantomime comic strip was made about the character by Wil Raymakers. It ran in the children's magazine Okki from 1986 on. In 2016, he also inspired a one-shot magazine named Loeki.

Sources

External links 

Stop-motion animated television series
1972 Dutch television series debuts
2004 Dutch television series endings
2019 Dutch television series debuts
Dutch children's animated television series
Animated television series about lions
Puppets
Advertising characters
Male characters in advertising
Fictional Dutch people
Corporate mascots
Cartoon mascots
Lion mascots
Television mascots
Television characters introduced in 1972
Comedy television characters
Dutch television shows featuring puppetry
Television shows adapted into comics
Dutch comic strips
Dutch comics characters
1986 comics debuts
Humor comics
Pantomime comics
Gag-a-day comics
Comics about animals